Rajshahi College (Bengali: রাজশাহী কলেজ) is the third oldest institution of higher education in Bangladesh. Established in 1873 in Rajshahi city, it is the third oldest college in Bangladesh after Dhaka College and Chittagong College. In 1895, Rajshahi College was the first institution in the territories now comprising Bangladesh to award a graduate (master's) degree. The first two master's degree candidates, Cayan Uddin Ahmed (Chawyone Uddin Ahmed) and N. N. Lehari, after graduation became Chief Secretary of Bengal and Session Judge respectively. Later both were awarded Khan Bahadur and Roy Bahadur titles. Rajshahi College offers three years bachelor and four years honours degree courses in various disciplines. The college is affiliated with the National University. Since 1996, it has stopped enrolling higher secondary students. It again started enrolling higher secondary students in 2010. Situated in the city center, Rajshahi College is adjacent to Rajshahi Collegiate School and is very near the famous Barendra Museum.

History

The origins of the college were in a private English School that had been founded in Rajshahi in 1828 by the concerted efforts of many of the region's most prominent citizens (this school is now known as Rajshahi Collegiate School). In 1836 the school was taken over by the provincial government of Bengal and was converted into a Government Zilla (or District) School. In 1873, again through the concerted efforts and appeals of local citizens, the Zilla School was given the status of an Intermediate College, and F.A. courses were introduced into its curriculum. With further development this college was accorded "first-grade rank" in 1878, which meant that it could teach B.A. courses and be affiliated to the University of Calcutta. The name "Rajshahi College" came with the first-grade rank in 1878. The year 1881 saw the inauguration of the M. A. classes; B.L. classes were added in 1883. The postgraduate Departments in Arts and in Law continued till 1909 when they were withdrawn because the college could not meet the requirements of the New Regulations of the University of Calcutta which came into force in that year.

Starting with only 6 students on the roll in 1873, the college counted 100 in 1878, 200 in 1900, 400 in 1910, 800 in 1920 and no less than 1000 in 1924; there was only one Muslim student at the college in 1873; 5 years later it was still one, but the figure rose to 156 in 1916 and climaxed at 215 in 1924. Subsequently, of course, Muslim numbers rose in the college and after 1947 eventually exceeded the Hindu numbers. Today, in independent Bangladesh, the college has been accorded "University College" status and no longer teaches Higher Secondary or Intermediate courses. Currently, it is part of the National University system of Bangladesh and its curriculum includes only undergraduate and post-graduate courses in a variety of disciplines.

Buildings
The main administrative building (shown in the picture), is a good example of British Indian colonial architecture. Other important older buildings of the colonial period include the Fuller Hostel Biology Building, Chemistry Building, Physics Building, former Muslim Hostel etc. Newer buildings include the Library and Auditorium, an Arts building, both dating from the 1950s and a new Science building, dating from the 1990s.

Rajshahi College and the Language Movement

Immediately after the killing of students in Dhaka on 21 February 1952 students in Rajshahi College built what is often thought to be the first (but short lived) martyr monument dedicated to the Language Movement. The present monument to the Language Movement dates from 1973. It was built to replace an earlier monument, built in 1969, that was destroyed by Pakistani forces in 1971.

E-Service
E-Service plays an important role to bring momentum, transparency and accountability in government service. To achieve the goals of A-2I Programme of Digital Bangladesh, Rajshahi College has taken some initiatives.

There are about 30,000 students pursuing education at HSC, Pass, Honors and Masters levels at Rajshahi College. About 250 teachers are engaged in teaching them and more than 150 other employees support the administration, accounts and all sorts of activities in this college. Frequent change in Principals and weakness in record keeping created serious difficulties in preserving records of essential documents and information of students. Moreover, it is much difficult and a tedious task for the administration to  maintain and ensure good governance of the college.

Keeping this in mind, Rajshahi College made an effort to establish exclusively a robust basis for the whole institution and started an ICT program in February 2012 with a view to keeping records of all data, information relating to students, teachers, finance and other things as well. Rajshahi College might be the sole institute which dared to manage its all data and information digitally and has become a pioneer institute to do all its jobs online.

Notable alumni and faculty

Highly distinguished alumni and faculty of Rajshahi College include:
 Radhabinod Pal
 Khademul Bashar
 Enamul Haque, professor from 1948 to 1952
 Qazi Motahar Hossain
 Hasan Azizul Huq
 Akshay Kumar Maitreya
 Jadunath Sarkar
 Ashrafuddin Ahmad Chowdhury
 Maqbular Rahman Sarkar

Former principals

Former vice principals

References

External links
 Rajshahi College Website
 Rajshahi College Barta
 RC FM Radio
Govt. Hazi Muhammad Mohsin College Chattogram 

Academic institutions associated with the Bengal Renaissance
Colleges affiliated to National University, Bangladesh
Educational institutions established in 1873
Colleges in Rajshahi District
Universities and colleges in Rajshahi District
1873 establishments in India
Education in Rajshahi